Cape Beale Lightstation is an active manned lighthouse  on Vancouver Island in British Columbia., Canada.

History
The lighthouse was built in 1874 and its focal plane is 51 meters above sea level. The present tower was built in 1958 and marks the entrance to Barkley Sound. It is 10 metres tall. Cape Beale received its name from Charles William Barkley, captain of the Imperial Eagle, who named it for his ship's purser, John Beale. The lighthouse is best known for its proximity to the West Coast Trail which is the theoretical route survivors of shipwrecks would take to get to the nearby community of Bamfield.

From 1971 to 1998, the Cape Beale Light was part of the British Columbia Shore Station Oceanographic Program, collecting coastal water temperature and salinity measurements for the Department of Fisheries and Oceans everyday for 27 years.

See also
 List of lighthouses in Canada
 List of lighthouses in British Columbia
 Graveyard of the Pacific

References

External links

 
 Aids to Navigation Canadian Coast Guard
Cape Beale Lightstation
Mills Landing Cottages and Charters
Bamfield, British Columbia

Lighthouses completed in 1874
Lighthouses completed in 1958
Lighthouses in British Columbia
Heritage sites in British Columbia
Lighthouses on the Canadian Register of Historic Places